The 1989 Penn State Nittany Lions football team represented the Pennsylvania State University in the 1989 NCAA Division I-A football season. The team was coached by Joe Paterno and played its home games in Beaver Stadium in University Park, Pennsylvania.

Schedule

Personnel

Season summary

Virginia

Temple

Boston College

at Texas

vs Rutgers

at Syracuse

Alabama

West Virginia

at Maryland

Notre Dame

at Pittsburgh

Holiday Bowl (vs BYU)

NFL Draft
Four Nittany Lions were drafted in the 1990 NFL Draft.

References

Penn State
Penn State Nittany Lions football seasons
Holiday Bowl champion seasons
Lambert-Meadowlands Trophy seasons
Penn State Nittany Lions football